Berkeley Fiction Review is an American literary magazine founded in 1981 and based at the University of California, Berkeley.  Stories that have appeared in the Berkeley Fiction Review have been reprinted in The Best American Short Stories and the Pushcart Prize anthology. The Berkeley Fiction Review sponsors an annual Sudden Fiction Contest.

Notable contributors

Ellen Akins
Jacob Appel
Peter Bichsel
Charles Bukowski
Will Eno
Seamus Deane
Mark Dery

Jürgen Fauth
DeWitt Henry
Neil Jordan
Perri Klass
Jeanne M. Leiby 
Karin Lin-Greenberg
B. K. Loren

Valerie Miner
John Montague
Jess Mowry
Álvaro Mutis
Joyce Carol Oates
Dmitri Prigov
Daniel Scott

Olga Sedakova
Hal Sirowitz
Elena Shvarts
Julia Vinograd
Gerald Vizenor
Nellie Wong

Masthead
Managing Editors
Isabel Hinchliff
Liam Magee
Kasandra Tapia
Julianne Han
Editors
Julia Cheunkarndee
Danica Chen
Gillian Gee
Danielle Tran
Conrad Loyer
Fiona Green
Sofia Hernandez
Joyce Ro
Sara Robertson
Maya Jimenez
Rachael Sandoval
Quinton Zakasky
Mia Garza-Jenkins

Founders
Julia Littleton
Jenne Mowry
Joe Sciallo
Paul Wedderien

Past Managing Editors

Lauren Cooper
Hannah Harrington
Ben Rowen
Lisa Jenkins
Miranda King
Kelsey Nolan 
Paige Vehlewald 

Tessa Gregory 
Eva Nierenberg 
Christian White 
Brighton Earley 
Jennifer Brown 
Caitlin McGuire
Rachel Brumit  

Bryce Kobrin
Rhoda Piland 
John Rauschenberg
Elaine Wong
Grace Fujimoto
Nikki Thompson 
Daphne Young

Hugh O'Byrne Pedy
Gregory Charles Magnuson
Mark Landsman 
Sean Andrew Locke 
James Penner 
Shelley Crist
Julia E. Lave

Julie Christianson 
Christina Ferrari 
Christopher Greger
Dionisio Valesco
Terrence Gee
Summar Farah
Bailey Dunn

Arya Sureshbabu
Molly Nolan
Regina Lim
Alex Jiménez
Madelyn Peterson
Aaron Saliman

Special Features
Issue 6 (1985–86): Contemporary Poetry from the Soviet Union
Issue 8 (Fall 1988): Works by, and Interviews with, Contemporary Irish Authors
Issue 9 (Fall 1989): Stereoscopic Photographs
Issue 16 (Spring 1997): First Annual Sudden Fiction Contest
Issue 17 (Fall 1997): An early work by international award-winning Colombian writer Álvaro Mutis

See also
List of literary magazines

References

External links
Berkeley Fiction Review Homepage

Literary magazines published in the United States
Magazines established in 1981
University of California, Berkeley
Magazines published in the San Francisco Bay Area
Student magazines published in the United States